David Lefèvre (born 29 April 1972 in Maubeuge, Nord) is a French former professional road bicycle racer.

Lefèvre is the older brother of professional cyclist Laurent Lefèvre and a cousin of Olivier Bonnaire.

Palmarès 

1993
 1st, Stage 3, Tour de Liège
1996
 1st, Stage 3, Tour of Japan
1999
 1st, Overall, Étoile de Bessèges
1st, Stage 3

External links 

1972 births
Living people
People from Maubeuge
French male cyclists
Sportspeople from Nord (French department)
Cyclists from Hauts-de-France